"Iris" is a song by American alternative rock band Goo Goo Dolls. Originally written for the soundtrack of the 1998 film City of Angels, the song was later included on the band's sixth album, Dizzy Up the Girl. The song was released as a single on April 1, 1998.

"Iris" has contributed greatly to the band's success. The song reached number one in Australia, Canada, and Italy, number three in the United Kingdom, number nine on the US Billboard Hot 100, and has become one of Ireland's best-selling singles of all time. "Iris" is the Goo Goo Dolls' signature song and has received critical acclaim, being described as a "ubiquitous" staple for the band's live sets.

Composition
After completing the first-edit on the film City of Angels, co-producer Bob Cavallo and his music producer son Rob Cavallo decided to take along musical artists to a viewing to create the soundtrack. Bob took Alanis Morissette whilst Rob took the Goo Goo Dolls. The following morning Morissette called Rob, and asked him to produce the song "Uninvited" which she had written afterwards as a demo. Shortly afterwards that same day, John Rzeznik called Rob with a song he had written called "Iris", a power ballad. In a 2013 interview with Songfacts, lead singer Rzeznik explained how he wrote the song:

Rzeznik named the song after country folk singer-songwriter Iris DeMent, after he noticed her name in a concert listing in the LA Weekly newspaper.

Commercial performance
Upon its release, "Iris" became second of a string of hits from the film's soundtrack, City of Angels: Music from the Motion Picture. (The first was Alanis Morissette's "Uninvited" and the third was Sarah McLachlan's "Angel"). The song debuted at number 66 on the Billboard Hot 100 Airplay chart on April 18, 1998, and eventually spent a then-record of 18 weeks at number one in Hot 100 Airplay. However it was not allowed to chart on the Billboard Hot 100 because no commercial single had been released. In December 1998, just after the song's airplay had peaked, the rules changed to allow airplay-only songs onto the chart. As a result, the song debuted and peaked at number nine and stayed on the chart for 14 weeks. On the Mainstream Rock Tracks chart, "Iris" peaked at number eight. The song was the band's second number one hit on the Modern Rock Tracks chart, following their 1995 hit "Name." "Iris" stayed at number one for five weeks on the Alternative Songs chart and also hit number one on the Mainstream Top 40 chart for four weeks. The song spent a then-record 17 weeks at number one on the Billboard Adult Top 40 chart (beating No Doubt's 15-week run at number one with "Don't Speak" in 1996–97). The Goo Goo Dolls performed "Iris" on October 20, 2001, at Madison Square Garden as part of The Concert for New York City to raise money for victims of the September 11 attacks.

"Iris" was also an international hit. It peaked at number five on the Irish Singles Chart and has since become the 19th biggest-selling single of all time in Ireland. The song initially peaked at number 50 in the United Kingdom in August 1998 before rising to number 26 the following year. On October 2, 2011, after performances by auditionees on The X Factor, the song re-entered the UK Singles Chart at number three. In May 2013, the song charted at number 12 after it was covered by Britain's Got Talent contestant Robbie Kennedy. Elsewhere, the song became a number-one hit in Italy (for two weeks), Australia (for five weeks), and Canada (for eight weeks), and it reached the top 10 in Flanders and the Netherlands.

Accolades and legacy
Besides the song's success on the charts, "Iris" enjoyed critical acclaim. At the 41st Grammy Awards, "Iris" received nominations for "Record of the Year" and "Pop Performance by a Duo or Group." The song also garnered Johnny Rzeznik a "Song of the Year" nomination. The single was certified septuple platinum by the Recording Industry Association of America on June 30, 2022. The song was ranked at number 39 on Rolling Stones list of the 100 greatest pop songs.

In October 2012, "Iris" was ranked number one on Billboards "Top 100 Pop Songs 1992–2012" chart, which ranked the top songs of the first 20 years of the Mainstream Top 40/Pop Songs chart. The list also featured the Goo Goo Dolls' hits "Slide", ranking at number nine, and "Name" at number 24. The Goo Goo Dolls are the only musicians to have three songs on the list, two breaking the top 10 and all three falling within the top 25. They are also the only musicians that have back to back singles (Iris, 1998 and Slide, 1999) featured on the list. In a revised list in October 2017, "Iris" still ranked in the top 10, at number eight.

Track listings

US promotional CD
 "Iris" (edit) – 3:36
 "Iris" (album version) – 4:51

Australian maxi-single
 "Iris" – 4:54
 "Lazy Eye" – 3:48
 "I Don't Want to Know" – 3:38

European cassette single
A. "Iris" – 3:36
B. "Lazy Eye" – 3:46

European CD single (1998)
 "Iris" – 3:36
 "Lazy Eye" – 3:46
 "I Don't Want to Know" – 3:37

European CD single (1999)
 "Iris" (radio edit) – 3:37
 "Iris" (acoustic) – 3:24

Charts

Weekly charts

Year-end charts

All-time charts

Certifications

Release history

Phoebe & Maggie version

While awaiting the results of the 2020 United States presidential election on November 3, singer-songwriter Phoebe Bridgers tweeted that she would cover "Iris" if Donald Trump lost. The cover, which was recorded as a duet with Maggie Rogers under the name Phoebe & Maggie, was released exclusively via Bridgers' Bandcamp page for one day only on November 13, with proceeds going towards Stacey Abrams' Fair Fight organization to promote fair elections in the state of Georgia as well as nationally. Despite only being available for purchase for one day, the song debuted at number one on the Digital Song Sales chart and number 57 on the Billboard Hot 100, making it both artists' first entry on the latter chart. The song has also charted in Australia, New Zealand, and Scotland.

On November 4, 2022, the song was re-released, again for only 24 hours, ahead of the 2022 midterm elections. Proceeds went to the Brigid Alliance, an abortion care group.

Charts

References

1990s ballads
1998 singles
1998 songs
2006 singles
American soft rock songs
Goo Goo Dolls songs
Number-one singles in Australia
Number-one singles in Italy
Reprise Records singles
Ronan Keating songs
RPM Top Singles number-one singles
Songs written by John Rzeznik
Songs written for films
Warner Records singles
Alternative rock ballads
Pop ballads